Racecourse is a suburb of Mackay in the Mackay Region, Queensland, Australia. In the  Racecourse had a population of 184 people.

Geography 
The northern boundary follows a small section of the Pioneer River while most of the eastern boundary is aligned with the North Coast railway line.

Most of the land in Racecourse is used for the cultivation of sugar cane.  The cane is transported via a network of cane tramways through the district and refined at the local Racecourse Sugar Mill.

History 
The suburb takes its name from the Mackay Racecourse established by the Mackay Turf Club in 1867 on the south-west corner of the Peak Downs Highway and Broadsound Road / Bruce Highway, which is now within present boundaries of the suburb of Ooralea and has been renamed Ooralea Racecourse.

At the  Racecourse  had a population of 242 people.

In the  Racecourse had a population of 184 people.

Heritage listings 
Racecourse has a number of heritage-listed places, including:
 Cowleys Road: Selwyn House

Education
There are no schools in Racecourse. The nearest government primary schools are Mackay West State School in neighbouring West Mackay to the east and Dundula State School in neighbouring Bakers Creek to the south-east. The nearest government secondary school is Mackay State High School in South Mackay to the east.

See also
 List of tramways in Queensland

References

External links
 

Suburbs of Mackay, Queensland